Thomas Young Simons (October 1, 1828 – April 30, 1878) was an American lawyer and politician.

Biography
Simons, third son of Dr. Thomas Y. Simons, was born in Charleston, S. C., October 1, 1828. He graduated from Yale College in 1847.

For two years after leaving college, he taught in the Charleston High School, preparing himself at the same time for admission to the bar. In 1850 he was admitted to practice, and except during the period covered by the American Civil War, continued to practice uninterruptedly in Charleston to the time of his death.

He married Annie L. Ancram in July 1852.

He represented his native city in the South Carolina General Assembly from 1854 to 1860, and in the latter year was one of the Democratic Presidential electors for South Carolina. He was also a member of the State Convention which passed the ordinance of secession in December 1860, and during the war which followed served as an officer in the Confederate service, first as Captain of the 27th Regiment, S. C. Volunteers, and later as Judge Advocate.

In September 1865, he became editor-in-chief of the Charleston Courier, and continued to act in this capacity until April 1873. This, joined with the labors of a lawyer in large practice, did much to impair his strength and to lay the foundation for his last illness. In the later years of his life he was prominently identified with the efforts to secure local self-government and the creation of a Union Reform party, in South Carolina. He died after a long illness, in Charleston, April 30, 1878, in his 50th year.

References

External links

1828 births
1878 deaths
19th-century American lawyers
19th-century American politicians
American newspaper editors
Confederate States Army officers
Lawyers from Charleston, South Carolina
Democratic Party members of the South Carolina House of Representatives
People of South Carolina in the American Civil War
Politicians from Charleston, South Carolina
Yale University alumni